The 1975–76 Indianapolis Racers season was the Indianapolis Racers' second season of operation in the World Hockey Association (WHA). The Racers made the playoffs this season, losing in the first round to the New England Whalers.

Offseason

Regular season

Final standings

Game log

Playoffs

New England Whalers Whalers 4, Indianapolis Racers Racers 3 - Quarter-Finals

Player stats

Note: Pos = Position; GP = Games played; G = Goals; A = Assists; Pts = Points; +/- = plus/minus; PIM = Penalty minutes; PPG = Power-play goals; SHG = Short-handed goals; GWG = Game-winning goals
      MIN = Minutes played; W = Wins; L = Losses; T = Ties; GA = Goals-against; GAA = Goals-against average; SO = Shutouts;

Awards and records

Transactions

Draft picks
Indianapolis's draft picks at the 1975 WHA Amateur Draft.

Farm teams

See also
1975–76 WHA season

References

External links

Ind
Ind
Indianapolis Racers seasons